Tsvety is a Soviet and Russian rock band that, according to Itogi magazine, "started all Russian alternative culture". It was one of the first bands to introduce rock music to the Soviet show business. The Flowers were established in 1969 by guitar player and songwriter Stas Namin. In 1973 The Flowers released flexis with producing company Melodiya; overall seven million copies were sold. After becoming a major hit in the USSR, in 1974 the band went on its first professional tour; but in 1975 the band dissolved as a result of a conflict with the Philharmonic Society, and it was liquidated by a decree of the Ministry of Culture of the USSR, its name was banned. It was only in 1977 that the band was resurrected under the new name The Stas Namin Group, in 1978 it went on tour still being banned by all central mass media outlets. In 1980, during the years of the Olympic Thaw, the band managed to release a solo album with Melodiya – Hymn to the Sun – and participate in a TV show, after that they were banned once again. The period of bans and persecution that lasted to 1986 ended with Perestroika when the life of the band got much easier: with their returned name The Flowers went on tour, performed abroad in the Western countries and completed a world tour in four years. In 1990 the band ceased its activities and, as a matter of fact, did not exist for the next almost ten years.

By the end of 80-s the Soviet monopolist record label Melodiya sold over sixty million copies of The Flowers records, but neither Stas Namin, nor the band members were paid out of this record sales. Namin wrote most of The Flowers songs. Many of them were banned, but those which were released became national hits. His song Happiness was a hit No. 1 for three years in 80-s, and even now it remains one of the most beloved songs for Russia and former Soviet Union. Over fifty famous musicians started their careers with The Flowers. Established and produced by Stas Namin in 1987, the Gorky Park rock-band was also formed of The Flowers members.

After the re-union in 1999 The Flowers celebrated their 30th Anniversary with a big concert in Moscow, but did not return to show business. They participated in the productions of Hair and Jesus Christ Superstar (Russian versions), and other projects at The Stas Namin Music and Drama Theater. In 2009 the band celebrated its 40th Anniversary with a grand show with special guest-stars, and actively started the new creative life. The Flowers recorded two albums "The Best of Flowers" at the Abbey Road studios. In 2013 they released two albums with the brand new songs – Homo Sapience and Flower Power. In autumn 2014 the Flowers are planning the 45th Anniversary tour that includes 45 cities in Russia, and in 2015 – a world tour. That will be a farewell tour of the legendary rock-band.

2009—2013: The Modern period
In 2009—2010 the band recorded double albums Back to the USSR (covering all their 1970s songs), and Window to Freedom (containing the songs prohibited in the 1980s) at the legendary Abbey Road Studio. Following the anniversary show of 6 March 2010 a DVD was released titled The Flowers, it was the first time that the band hit the stage after more than a twenty-year break and started touring on a regular basis again. In 2012 the band delivered a great show at Crocus City Hall where, in addition to well-known hits and prohibited songs of the 1980s presented a modern, completely new repertoire. The show was released on two albums – Homo Sapiens and Flower Power.

2009: Back to the USSR album
In 2009 The Flowers recorded a double album Back to the USSR that was dedicated to its 40th anniversary and included the best twenty four songs created from 1969 to 1983. Most of them were well-known hits but also some were recorded for the first time. The album was produced in London at the legendary Abbey Road Studio. Back to the USSR features not only members of The Flowers but also guest musicians, ex-members of the band and even deceased musicians represented on the album by their songs and samples taken from old records.

2010: Anniversary show – The Flowers 40 Years
On 6 March 2010 The Flowers celebrated their 40th anniversary in Moscow at Crocus City Hall. The Flowers anniversary show featured various ex-members of the band including Yury Fokin, Konstantin Nikolskiy, Vladimir Chugreyev, Alexander Slizunov, Vladimir Semyonov, Vladislav Petrovskiy, etc., friends of the band (Andrey Makarevich, Yury Shevchuk, Garik Sukachov, Nikolai Noskov, Alexander Marshal, Dmitry Revyakin, Julia Chicherina, Evgeniy Khavtan, Lyudmila Gurchenko, Oscar Feltsman, etc.), and even the choir representing the Children's Variety Theater, the chamber ensemble Moscow Soloists conducted by Yuri Bashmet, the soloist ensemble representing the Stas Namin Theater, representatives of different religious denominations and ethnic musicians from all over the world. The show summarized the entire creative forty-year history of the band and, in some way, freed the musicians from the image that formed during that period to give them the freedom to evolve further.

2011: Window to Freedom album
Thirty years after releasing the first (and actually the last) art album titled Hymn to the Sun (1980) the band recorded their new album Open Wide Your Window at the Abbey Road Studio in London. The record contained fifteen previously unreleased (due to strict censorship) songs but written mostly in 1980 with lyrics by 1960s poets as well as two new songs by Namin – Hymn to Today's Heroes and Window to Freedom. The International Society of Sound established by Peter Gabriel named the Window to Freedom album one of the most interesting in the world of music in terms of music, poetry, arrangements and recording quality.

2012: Flower Power show
In November 2012 The Flowers presented their new show at Crocus City Hall. In the first half of the three-hour show the band performed their new modern program titled Homo Sapiens, in the second half they played remakes of their well-known hits featuring a number of guest bands including, for example, Time Machine, Voskresenie, Kalinov Most, Zvuki Mu, Zdob si Zdub, Moral Codex as well as the ex-members of the band Alexey Kozlov (Arsenal), Andrey Sapunov (Voskresenie), Alexander Solich (Moral Codex) and the Alexandrov Russian Army Ensemble, Todes ballet, Glinka Quartette, etc.

In the new show Flower Power The Flowers are as different from their early records as the early The Beatles are different from their last albums.

After finding their own style in the 1970s The Flowers have been developing it so that each new album brings not only new songs, arrangements and poetry but a somewhat new vision.

References

External links
 flowersrock.ru – Russian site of group "The Flowers"
 Information on the band (in Russian)
 Discography of the band (in Russian)

Soviet rock music groups
Soviet vocal-instrumental ensembles
Russian rock music groups
Musical groups from Moscow